Geijera is a genus of shrubs and trees in the family Rutaceae and are native to New Guinea, Australia and New Caledonia. They have simple leaves arranged alternately, panicles of bisexual flowers usually with five, sometimes four, sepals, petals and stamens and fruit containing shiny black seeds.

Description
Plants in the genus Geijera are shrubs or trees with simple leaves arranged alternately. They have small, bisexual flowers arranged in many-flowered panicles in upper leaf axils and on the ends of branchlets and usually have five, sometimes four sepals, petals and stamens. The fruit consists of up to five more or less spherical follicles joined at the base each with a single shiny black seed.

Taxonomy
The genus Geijera was first formally described in 1834 by Schott in his book Rutaceae - Fragmenta Botanica and the first species to be describe (the type species) was Geijera salicifolia. The name Geijera honours J.D. Geijer, a 17th century Swedish botanist.

Species list
The following is a list of species accepted by the Australian Plant Census, or Plants of the World Online for species outside Australia:
 Geijera balansae Schinz & Guillaumin – New Caledonia
 Geijera cauliflora Baill. – New Caledonia
 Geijera deplanchei (Pancher & Siebert) Däniker – New Caledonia
 Geijera linearifolia (DC.) J.M.Black – South Australia, Western Australia
 Geijera parviflora Lindl. – Queensland, New South Wales, Victoria, South Australia
 Geijera salicifolia Schott – New Guinea, New Caledonia, Queensland, New South Wales, Northern Territory.

Plants of the World Online includes G. helmsiae and G. paniculata but the Australian Plants Census lists these as synonyms of Coatesia paniculata.

Distribution and habitat
Most species of Geijera grow in tropical or subtropical rainforest. Three species occur on New Caledonia, and three in Australia, two of which are endemic.

References

   

 
Taxa named by Heinrich Wilhelm Schott
Zanthoxyloideae genera